Benas may refer to:

Places 
 Benasque, a town in the comarca of Ribagorza, province of Huesca, Spain

People 
 Benas Šatkus (born 2001), Lithuanian footballer
 Benas Veikalas, Lithuanian basketball player

Lithuanian masculine given names